The NJIT Highlanders men's basketball team is the basketball team that represents New Jersey Institute of Technology in Newark, New Jersey, United States. The school's teams are members of the America East Conference.

Postseason

CIT results
The Highlanders have appeared in the CollegeInsider.com Postseason Tournament (CIT) three times. Their combined record is 7–3. The 2015 CIT was their first Division I post season tournament.

NCAA Division III Tournament results
The Highlanders have appeared in the NCAA Division III Tournament five times. Their combined record is 3–5.

References

External links

Website